Farm programs can be part of a concentrated effort to boost a country’s agricultural productivity in general or in specific sectors where they may have a comparative advantage. There are many different types of farm programs, with a variety of objectives and created with different economic mechanisms in mind. Some are meant to benefit farmers directly, while others seek to benefit consumers. They target food prices and quantity of food available on the market, as well as production and consumption of certain goods.  Some are meant to benefit farmers directly, while others seek to benefit consumers. They target food prices and quantity of food available on the market, as well as production and consumption of certain goods.

Farm Programs in the United States of America 
In United States agricultural policy, the term farm programs is generally meant to include the commodity programs administered by the Farm Service Agency, as well as the other USDA programs that directly benefit farmers. Some examples of the other programs include farm loans, federal crop insurance, the Noninsured Assistance Program (NAP), the Conservation Reserve Program (CRP), and conservation cost sharing, and the "food stamps" program of SNAP, which is included in each farm spending bill because it acts as a subsidy, keeping crop prices higher by increasing financial demand for food by about eighty billion dollars per year (in 2014).

Farm programs in the United States may seem obscure or confusing because rather than being a unit that was planned together, these programs have been developed through trial and error. Programs have been added or adjusted since the 1930s as problems have been identified with previous versions.

In the book “Food Policy in the United States” (2018), food economist Dr. Parke Wilde offers helpful advice for understanding the tangle that farm programs may seem to be. He suggests identifying whom a policy helps, hurts, and what changes it has on the quantities produced and consumed of the farm products it targets. The book discusses the seven broad categories of farm programs that are summarized below: price supports, supply control, deficiency payments, direct payments, countercyclical payments, insurance, and demand expansion.

Price supports: keep the price of a product higher than it would be on the market without government intervention. They must include some kind of enforcement mechanism that keeps prices from lowering to the market level. One form of enforcement is purchase and removal, where the government offers to buy any quantity that farmers want to sell at a specified support price. Another is a nonrecourse loan, where the government offers farmers a loan at a specified loan rate and the farmers then choose between paying the loan back or forfeiting their harvest to the government as full repayment.

(a)   Helps: domestic farmers

(b)   Hurts: consumers with a low food budget

(c)    Effect on product price: raises the prices for farmers and consumers

(d)   Effect on product quantities: increase

Supply control: reduces the quantity planted or sold of a crop, which is intended to lower the supply of the good that is available on the market and raise the price of the good above the market equilibrium. This policy also requires some form of enforcement mechanism, which could be a production quota for domestic farmers or restrictions on international trade.

(a)   Helps: domestic farmers

(b)   Hurts: consumers with a low food budget, farmers in other countries

(c)    Effect on product price: raises the prices for farmers and lowers prices for consumers

(d)   Effect on product quantities: decrease

Deficiency payments: a policy where the government pays the difference between a target price they determine and the price that the buyer is supposed to pay. It only occurs on years when the market price is lower than the target price.

(a)   Helps: domestic farmers, consumers

(b)   Hurts: farmers in other countries

(c)    Effect on product price: raises the prices for farmers and consumers

(d)   Effect on product quantities: increase

Direct payments: decoupled subsidies made directly to farmers, which are payments that do not depend on the current production decisions of a farmer. Instead, they are based on the historical production of the farmer during several recent years but not the current one. In the United States, these kinds of payments were terminated in the 2014 Farm Bill.

(a)   Helps: domestic farmers

(b)   Effect on farmers: raises their income

Countercyclical payments: another type of decoupled subsidy, which is not based on a farmer’s current production decisions but rather on their historical production quantities. They are made on years when the market price of a product is comparatively low and are usually supplementary to direct payments and deficiency payments.

(a)   Helps: domestic farmers

(b)   Effect on farmers: raises their income

Insurance: although farmers could get insurance for their crops from private companies the way it is done for cars or homes, the government understands that those insurance markets are inadequate, and that farmers cannot afford the premiums at market rate. However, risks in farming are very high so the government provides various insurance programs for reducing farmers’ exposure to economic and weather risk. With one type of program, the government subsidizes the premium payment for insurance policies provided by a private insurance company as well as some of the administrative costs of the program. Another type of program provides disaster payments after a natural disaster and does not require a premium from farmers to receive the aid.

(a)   Helps: domestic farmers

(b)   Effect on farmers: raises their income

Demand expansion: These types of programs seek to increase the quantity that consumers are willing to buy at each price, known in economics as the demand. This raises the price for the products and also the quantity of the product that is consumed. Examples of these programs in the United States include the Renewable Fuels Standard for increasing the demand of corn, commodity checkoff programs for increasing the demand for beef, and export promotion programs for increasing the demand for food products created from corn.

(a)   Helps: farmers of the product for which demand is expanded

(b)   Effect on product price: raises the prices for farmers and consumers

(c)    Effect on product quantities: increase

These are some of the mechanisms available to governments for affecting food production, farmer incomes, and food prices in their countries. By affecting what happens locally, countries may also have an effect on what happens internationally. The size of the effect depends on how much of a certain good a country produces and sells on the international market relative to other countries. This makes farm programs potentially controversial, because they offer a way for countries to give their farmers an advantage over those in other countries and also because they can affect agricultural economies abroad.

References

United States Department of Agriculture